The Farnsworth Apartments is a historic three-story building in Ogden, Utah. It was built by the Taylor Building Company in 1922, and acquired by investors J. W. and Flora F. Farnsworth in 1923. It has been listed on the National Register of Historic places since December 31, 1987.

References

Buildings and structures in Ogden, Utah	
National Register of Historic Places in Weber County, Utah
Residential buildings completed in 1922
1922 establishments in Utah